This is a survey of the postage stamps and postal history of Prince Edward Island.

First stamps
The first stamps of Prince Edward Island were issued in 1861.

See also
List of people on stamps of the Canadian provinces
Postage stamps and postal history of Canada

References

Further reading
Lehr, James C. The Postage Stamps & Cancellations of Prince Edward Island, 1814-1873. Toronto: The Unitrade Press, 1987.

External links
Prince Edward Island Stamps by A.A. Bartlett at philatelicdatabase.com

Economy of Prince Edward Island
Philately of Canada